Winthrop University is a public university in Rock Hill, South Carolina. It was founded in 1886 by David Bancroft Johnson, who served as the superintendent of Columbia, South Carolina, schools. He received a grant from Robert Charles Winthrop, a Boston philanthropist and chair of the Peabody Education Board in Massachusetts, to establish the school.

Since its inception, Winthrop has developed into a comprehensive university offering undergraduate and graduate degrees through five colleges and schools. The Carnegie Classification lists Winthrop among "Master's Colleges & Universities: Larger Programs." With approximately 6,000 students, it is the sixth largest university in South Carolina.

Fielding athletic teams known as Winthrop Eagles, the university participates in the National Collegiate Athletic Association (NCAA) at the Division I level as a member of Big South Conference. The athletic program is known for its success in basketball, volleyball, tennis, and soccer.

History
Winthrop University was founded In 1886, when the Peabody Education Board of Massachusetts, headed by Robert Charles Winthrop, provided $1,500 to form the "Winthrop Training School" for white women teachers. That year the school opened its doors to twenty-one students in Columbia, South Carolina. Nine years later in 1895 it moved to Rock Hill.  The school's name had changed in 1893 to "Winthrop Normal and Industrial College of South Carolina", reflecting its mission to prepare some students for industrial jobs.

The college was segregated until 1964. It became fully coeducational in 1974.  Evolving from a training school to a college with a four-year full curriculum, it also developed a graduate division. By 1992 it reflected this development, changing its name to Winthrop University.

In 1943 First Lady Eleanor Roosevelt visited the university. It has become common for presidential candidates to visit the university during election season. In 2015, a forum for the Democratic party was held on campus, which included candidates Bernie Sanders and Hillary Clinton. President Barack Obama spoke at Winthrop in 2008 when he was first a presidential candidate.

Campus
The university's campus is in the city of Rock Hill, South Carolina. The Winthrop College Historic District is listed on the National Register of Historic Places (NRHP), as are Tillman Hall and Withers Building. The Winthrop University campus has its own zip code of 29733. Rock Hill has a total of five historic districts listed on the NRHP.

Winthrop's campus is divided into two distinct areas: The main campus which houses the academic buildings, residence halls, library and campus center, and the more recently constructed  Recreational and Research Complex, located about one mile northeast of the main campus.

Winthrop's main campus has had extensive development since the late 20th century. A $12 million Dalton Hall opened in 1999. The Courtyard at Winthrop, which features apartment-style residences for students, opened in 2003. The Lois Rhame West Health, Physical Education and Wellness Center opened in 2007; it is the new home of the university's physical education department and intramural sports. The most recent addition, in 2010, is the DiGiorgio Campus Center, which added a  multi-purpose campus center. This features a 225-seat movie theater, food court, campus bookstore, post office, and casual dining. The DiGiorgio Center is connected to the West Center via an open-air plaza.

The Research Complex hosts the Piedmont Wetlands Research Project, a golf course (open to faculty, students and alumni), and a world-class disc golf course. (This has been the site of the United States Disc Golf Championship since its opening in 1999).

Winthrop's campus has served as the site for filming of numerous movies, television and other video productions, including the 2008 film Asylum (starring Sarah Roemer), and the 1999 film The Rage: Carrie 2. Additionally, the Winthrop Coliseum has hosted numerous television tapings of various syndicated television programs.

The campus police are known as the Winthrop University Campus Police Department. The department has 11 sworn officers serving a student population of 6,109.

Organization and administration 
Appointed by the board of trustees, the university president is the chief administrative officer of Winthrop University. George W. Hynd was appointed Interim President in January 2020 and succeeded Daniel F. Mahony who served since 2015. The university president is responsible for the administration of the university and oversees budgeting and financial planning, enrollment and admissions, academic planning, university facilities, and other matters.

The Winthrop University Board of Trustees consists of fifteen members, including the Governor of South Carolina and the State Superintendent of Education (or their designees). According to the bylaws, the Board of Trustees has the “authority and responsibility for the governance of Winthrop University.” In addition to the university president, the Board confirms the appointments of the Provost and Executive Vice President for Academic Affairs, deans, vice presidents, and other administrators.

The university grants undergraduate degrees through four colleges: the College of Arts and Sciences, the College of Business Administration, the Richard W. Riley College of Education, and the College of Visual and Performing Arts.

Academics

Winthrop is accredited by the Commission on Colleges of the Southern Association of Colleges and Schools to award baccalaureate, master's, and specialist degrees. In all the university offers 43 undergraduate and 40 graduate degrees and certificates.

Academic colleges 
Winthrop is organized into four major academic colleges.

College of Business Administration 
Founded in 1968, the College of Business Administration awards the Bachelor of Science and Bachelor of Arts degrees. Two Master of Business Administration degrees are offered at the graduate level. The College of Business Administration has been accredited by AACSB-International since 1979.

Richard W. Riley College of Education 
Created in 1968, the College of Education was renamed the Richard W. Riley College of Education in 2000. At the undergraduate level, the Bachelor of Science degree is awarded. The Richard W. Riley College of Education confers the Master of Arts in Teaching, Master of Science, and Master of Education graduate degrees, and offers an educational specialist in education leadership (Ed.S.) program.

College of Visual and Performing Arts 
The College of Visual and Performing Arts was established in 1988 and consists of the departments of Design, Fine Arts, Music, and Theatre and Dance. At the undergraduate level, the College of Visual and Performing Arts confers the Bachelor of Arts, Bachelor of Fine Arts, Bachelor of Design, Bachelor of Music, and Bachelor of Music Education degrees. The Master of Arts, Master of Fine Arts, Master of Music, and Master of Music Education degrees are offered at the graduate level. Students and faculty produce over 100 music performances annually, theatre and dance performances, and numerous curated exhibitions in two campus art galleries. Winthrop University is one of 37 universities nationally—and the only public or private institution in South Carolina—with all arts programs accredited.

College of Arts and Sciences 
Established in 1967, the College of Arts and Sciences awards the Bachelor of Arts, Bachelor of Science, and Bachelor of Social Work degrees. At the graduate level, the College of Arts and Sciences awards the Master of Liberal Arts, Master of Arts, Master of Social Work, and Master of Science degrees, as well as a Specialist degree in school psychology.

University College 
Overseen by the Dean of University College and Vice Provost for Student Success, Winthrop's University College was created in 2003 to coordinate and support “programs in both academic affairs and student affairs.” Although University College does not confer academic degrees, all undergraduate students are served by its various offices, resources, and range of programs. University College houses the Academic Success Center, Office of Undergraduate Research, and International Center. The university Honors Program, McNair Scholars Program, Leadership Studies Program, TRiO Achievers Program, and General Education Program are also major components of University College. Winthrop's University College allows faculty and staff to work across disciplines to ensure all students have a common academic foundation.

Honors Program 
Founded in 1960, Winthrop University's Honors Program is among the oldest in the nation. Dr. John S. Eells served as the founding director of Winthrop's University Honors Program and was elected the fourth President of the National Collegiate Honors Council in 1970.  

Today over 250 students from each of Winthrop's four degree granting colleges participate in the University Honors Program. Honors Program students have access to early registration for classes, may enroll in small honors seminars, and receive honors academic advising. Many honors courses are taught at The Honors Center at The Courtyard at Winthrop, which offers a dedicated residence life program for University Honors Program students. Students must complete 23 hours of honors coursework, an honors thesis or other culminating experience, a service learning project, and maintain a minimum 3.30 grade point average to graduate with a University Honors Program degree. Students who compete these requirements receive honors recognition and honors academic regalia at commencement.

Ida Jane Dacus Library and Louise Pettus Archives & Special Collections 
Named after Winthrop University's first librarian, the current library building opened in 1969 in response to the university's growth. The Ida Jane Dacus Library contains 476,473 volumes, circulates 38,943 items per year, and participates in the Interlibrary loan and PASCAL delivers programs. The Louise Pettus Archives & Special Collections, housed in a separate structure on Cherry Road, contains original documents, manuscripts, and rare books about Winthrop University's history as well as the state of South Carolina's history, including the Catawba region. The academic and administrative affairs of both the Ida Jane Dacus Library and Louise Pettus Archives & Special Collections are overseen by the dean, who reports directly to the provost and executive vice president for academic affairs.

Faculty 
The university employs 286 full-time and 222 part-time faculty members, 59 of whom are classified as minorities and 290 of whom are women. Of the 286 full-time faculty members, 248 have earned their terminal degree, 34 have a non-terminal master's degree, and one has a non-terminal bachelor's degree. Currently, the student-faculty ratio is 12:1.

Rankings and admissions
In 2021, Winthrop was ranked as the #13 Best Regional University in the South by U.S. News & World Report, as well as the #7 Best College for Veterans and #11 Best College for Undergraduate Teaching. Winthrop has been recognized as South Carolina's top-rated university according to evaluations conducted by the South Carolina Commission on Higher Education. Winthrop has been rated by the commission as "substantially exceeding standards" every year since that classification was created in 2003.

Admission to Winthrop is defined by U.S. News & Report as “selective” with an acceptance rate of 69%. The average freshman had a 3.98 high school GPA and received an SAT (CR+M) score between 980-1200 and an ACT score between 19 and 25.

Student life
The university has 6,073 students. Undergraduate students come from 42 states and 45 countries.  There are 135 undergraduate international students enrolled. The majority of Winthrop's students are from South Carolina, with out-of-state and foreign students accounting for 13% of undergraduate enrollment. 

Of the student population, 5,014 are undergraduate students and 1,059 are graduate students. The student body is 29 percent male and 71 percent female. The student body is 28 percent African-American and 60 percent white, non-Hispanic.

The university's average size of undergraduate lecture courses is 22 students. All freshman and second-year students are required to live on campus, unless they live at home with their parents or legal guardians. Ninety-one (91%) percent of freshman and forty-five (45%) percent of all undergraduate students live on-campus.

Student culture 

Winthrop's DiGiorgio Student Union Program Board has been ranked the best Program Board in the nation three times for the quality and variety of programming, including both lecturers and entertainers. The trade publication Campus Activities Magazine has ranked the university as having the "Best Campus Program" in the nation in 1995, 2002, 2004, and 2013. Winthrop is the only university in the nation to be on the ballot every year since this award was inaugurated in 1995.

In addition to completing the academic requirements of their chosen degree, full-time Winthrop undergraduates, in order to graduate, are required to attend three cultural events for every 20 semester hours. The university maintains an extensive calendar of events that qualify as being "cultural events".

Cultural events are typically on a wide variety of subjects, and have included in the past:
 Films (both in English and world languages)
 Plays
 Concerts (Chamber, jazz, orchestral, and on the university's Aeolian-Skinner pipe organ)
 Sculpture and art exhibitions
 Lectures and discussions

The university has more than 180 student organizations. It has eight campus ministries, 11 club sports teams, seven cultural organizations, 19 clubs associated with an academic department, 19 Greek organizations, 19 Honor Societies, 19 special interest clubs and groups, three political groups, 23 professional groups, seven non-ministry religious groups, nine university representatives, seven residence hall councils and 10 service groups.

Greek life 
The university recognizes 19 chapters of national fraternities and sororities with over 700 students members. Fraternities include Alpha Phi Alpha, Kappa Alpha Psi, Omega Psi Phi, Phi Beta Sigma, Pi Kappa Alpha, Pi Kappa Phi, Phi Mu Alpha, Sigma Alpha Epsilon, and Tau Kappa Epsilon. Sororities include Alpha Delta Pi, Alpha Kappa Alpha, Chi Omega, Delta Sigma Theta, Delta Zeta, Sigma Gamma Rho, Sigma Sigma Sigma, Zeta Phi Beta, Zeta Sigma Chi, and Zeta Tau Alpha.

Student media 
The Johnsonian, Winthrop's independent weekly student newspaper, has been published since 1923. It's available in print on campus and digitally on MyTJNow.com. In 2016, it was voted as the top student newspaper in the state of South Carolina by the S.C. Press Association.

Athletics

The university is a member of the National Collegiate Athletic Association (NCAA) and competes on the Division I level.

Winthrop is a charter member of the Big South Conference. Winthrop's teams are known as the Eagles and their colors are garnet and gold.

The university sponsors 17 intercollegiate teams (eight men's and 10 women's) in baseball, basketball, cross country, golf, soccer, and track on the men's side, and basketball, cross country, golf, lacrosse, soccer, softball, track and volleyball on the women's side.

The university has labeled itself "The Campus of Champions" as its intercollegiate athletic teams have experienced success in recent years. Specifically, the university has won numerous Big South Conference championships in the following sports: baseball (three since 1995), men's basketball (eleven since 1988), men's cross country (two since 2000), men's soccer (six since 2002), men's tennis (four since 1997*), women's tennis (20 since 1994*), softball (three since 1989), women's lacrosse (two since 2015), and women's volleyball (four since 2002).

The tennis programs were discontinued in 2020 due to financial losses from the university caused by the COVID-19 pandemic.

Facilities

At the heart of the university's athletic facilities is the Winthrop Coliseum. In addition to serving as the home venue of the men's and women's basketball and volleyball teams, the university's athletic department offices are located in the Coliseum. The arena features 6,100 permanent seats and hosts numerous non-university shows and events in addition to Winthrop athletic contests. The Coliseum also served as the temporary practice site of the NFL's Carolina Panthers until completion of the team's facilities in Charlotte.

The Winthrop baseball team plays at Winthrop Ballpark, a multimillion-dollar 1,989-seat baseball stadium which opened in 2003.

Opened in 2005, the university's track and field teams compete on the $2.8 million Irwin Belk Track Complex. The facility hosts numerous Division 1 meets.

The university's soccer teams compete at the recently completed Eagle Field. The facility features 1,800 permanent seats, a press box, field house, and a Daktronics LCD scoreboard. In addition, the playing field is a Tifway 419 hybrid Bermuda grass with Eagle Blend and Sun Star.

The softball team competes at the Winthrop Softball Complex, which opened in 2001. The facility includes four fields, locker rooms, and an indoor batting cage.

Men's basketball

Perhaps the university's most well-known athletic team is the men's basketball team, which has earned a berth in twelve NCAA Division I men's basketball tournaments since 1999. Additionally, it has won the Big South Conference Championship thirteen times (1988, 1999, 2000, 2001, 2002, 2005, 2006, 2007, 2008, 2010, 2017, 2020, and 2021). Winthrop has won more Big South Conference Championships than any other school in the conference.

On March 5, 2007, the Winthrop Eagles men's basketball team was ranked in the Top 25 of both major college basketball polls for the first time in school history. The Eagles were ranked #22 in the USA TODAY/ESPN Top 25 poll and #24 on the Associated Press (AP) Top 25 poll. Later that spring on March 16, 2007, the Winthrop Eagles defeated Notre Dame for the first NCAA men's basketball tournament win in school history.

Seven men's basketball championships came during Gregg Marshall's tenure as head coach. He left Winthrop to become the head coach at Wichita State University. Marshall's assistant at Winthrop, Randy Peele, was named as his successor and led the Eagles to win Big South Championships in 2008 and 2010.

In March 2012, Winthrop named Pat Kelsey as the new head coach of the Eagles. Under Kelsey, the program had a record of 186–95. In 2017, the Eagles earned a #13 seed in the NCAA tournament but lost to #4 Butler in the opening round. The Eagles earned an automatic bid into the 2020 NCAA tournament, which was cancelled due to the COVID-19 pandemic. In 2021, the Eagles earned a #12 seed in the NCAA tournament and lost to #5 Villanova in the first round. Kelsey left Winthrop following the 2021 season to become head coach at the College of Charleston.

Notable people

Faculty 
 Scott Huffmon, political scientist and director of the Winthrop Poll
 Elizabeth Friench Johnson, head of Modern Languages department from 1922 to 1955
Melissa Reeves, former president of the National Association of School Psychologists
Louise Siddall, composer, music department chair
 Ruth Stokes, mathematician, cryptologist, and astronomer

Alumni

Academics
Lakeyta Bonnette-Bailey, academic

Government 

DeAndrea Benjamin, Judge of the United States Court of Appeals for the Fourth Circuit
Ruth Williams Cupp, South Carolina state legislator
Steven Dillingham (1973), director of the United States Census Bureau
Mary Gordon Ellis (1913), first woman elected to the South Carolina legislature
Martha Thomas Fitzgerald (1916), first woman elected to the South Carolina House of Representatives in a general election
Chip Huggins (1987), member of South Carolina House of Representatives
Harriet F. Johnson (1917), member of South Carolina House of Representatives
Ann McCrory, First Lady of North Carolina
Terence Roberts, mayor of Anderson, South Carolina
Gary Simrill, member of the South Carolina House of Representatives
Linda H. Short (1984), former South Carolina State Senator
Lois Rhame West (1943), First Lady of South Carolina (1971–1975); first woman to chair the Muscular Dystrophy Association; co-chair of Winthrop's first capital campaign
Kate Vixon Wofford (1916), first woman to hold elected office in South Carolina

Arts 

Cathy Smith Bowers (BA, 1972; MA, 1976), poet and professor; North Carolina Poet Laureate (2010–2012)
Leigh Chapman, screenwriter, television writer and actress
Matthew Cordell, Caldecott-award-winning children's book illustrator
Bob Crawford, jazz guitarist; bass player for Grammy-nominated The Avett Brothers
Morri Creech, writer; Pulitzer Prize nominee for poetry
Anne King Gregorie (1902), historian; first woman to be granted a doctorate in history by the University of South Carolina
Shanola Hampton, actress best known for her role in the television show Shameless
Mary Gaulden Jagger (1942), one of the founding members of the National Organization for Women
Chris Leroux, professional baseball player and star of The Bachelor Canada (2017)
Andie MacDowell, Golden Globe nominated actress, attended Winthrop from 1976 to 1978
Jan Millsapps, filmmaker
Desmond Pringle, gospel musician
Thomas James Reddy, artist, poet, activist
Derrick Henry, reality TV star on MTV
Emery post hardcore band was founded at Winthrop by several Winthrop alumni

Business 

 Amber Armstrong (1997), IBM chief marketing officer for Watson IoT
 Thomas Stringfellow (1981), CEO at Riverbanks Zoo

Athletics 

 Craig Bradshaw (2007), professional basketball player for Australian team Brisbane Bullets
 Xavier Cooks (2017), professional basketball player for Australian team Sydney Kings
 Lucille Godbold, gold medalist for shot put in the 1922 Women's World Games
 John Gilkerson (2007), professional soccer player with MLS's New York Red Bulls
 Henry Kalungi (2009), professional soccer player with USL's Richmond Kickers
 David Kenga (2006), professional soccer player with USL's Charleston Battery
 Otto Loewy (2009), professional soccer player with MLS's New England Revolution
 Michael Luk (2009), professional soccer player in China
 Stephen Nsereko (2010) professional soccer player with USL's Richmond Kickers
 Marco Reda (2000), professional soccer player with MLS's Toronto FC
 Kevin Slowey (2003), professional baseball player with the Minnesota Twins
 Chad Steele, vice president of public relations for the Baltimore Ravens; NFL media liaison
 Matt Stinson, professional soccer player with MLS's Toronto FC

References

External links

 
Buildings and structures in Rock Hill, South Carolina
Educational institutions established in 1886
Former women's universities and colleges in the United States
Public universities and colleges in South Carolina
Universities and colleges accredited by the Southern Association of Colleges and Schools
Education in York County, South Carolina
1886 establishments in South Carolina